The University of Library Studies and Information Technologies has got university status by a resolution of the National Assembly of Bulgaria of 29 September 2010.

It is the successor consequently of the Specialised Higher School of Library Studies and Information Technologies (est. 2 Sept 2004), the College of Library Studies and Information Technologies (CLSIT), the College of Library Studies (CLS), the Institute of Library Studies (ILS) and the State Institute of Library Studies (est. 1950).

SULSIT is member of the Balkan Universities Network.

Structure 
As of 2012, the structure of SULSIT is as follows:
The Faculty of Library Studies and Cultural Heritage
Library Sciences Dept.
Library Management Dept.
Book and Society Dept.
Cultural and Historical Heritage Dept.
The Faculty of Information Sciences
Information Systems and Technologies Dept.
Communications and Security Dept.
Computer Sciences Dept.
Department of Comprehensive Studies
Foreign Language Preparation Centre
Institutes, Research Centres and Labs
Institute for Scientific Research and Doctoral Programs (PhD School)
Research Institute in Organisation, Management and Protection of Cultural and Historical Heritage
Centre for Continuing Education
Centre for Distance Education
Centre for Information Security and Protection
Centre for Career Orientation and Student Development
Scientific and Research Laboratory for Cybernetic Security
John Atanasoff Computer Lab
Oracle Lab
Publishing House „Za Bukvite – O Pismeneh”
Facilities:
Microsoft Developers Network Academic Alliance
Library and Information Centre (with a reading-room for 150 people)
Education and demonstration museum collection „Spirit and Leadership”
Chapel of St Nicholas the Miracle-Maker
Sports Complex (indoor and outdoor facilities for tennis, mini-football, gym)

Programmes 
The curricula for the Bachelor and master's degrees are in line with the requirements of the Higher Education Act and the European Credit Transfer System (ECTS).

As of academic year 2014/2015, SULSIT offers the following Bachelor Programs:
Faculty of Library Studies and Cultural Heritage:
 Library Studies and Bibliography (LSB)
 Library and Information Management (LIM)
 Press Communications (PC)
 Archives and Document Studies (ADS)
 Information Funds of the Cultural and Historical Heritage (IFCHH)
 Information Resources of Tourism (IRT)
 Communications and Informing (CI)
 Public policies and practices (PPP)
Faculty of Information Sciences:
 Information Technologies (IT)
 Information Brokering (IB)
 Information Security (IS)
 Computer Sciences (CS)
 Information Technologies in Law Administration (ITLA)
 National Security and Cultural and Historical Heritage (NSCHH)
 National Security (NS)

SULSIT trains students in the following M.A Degree Programs:
Faculty of Library Studies and Cultural Heritage:
Library-Informing and Cultural Management
Publishing Business and Electronic Resources
Media Information and Advertising
Cultural and Historical Heritage in the Modern Information Environment
Protection of Cultural and Historical Heritage in the Republic of Bulgaria
Culture Tourism
Electronic content: innovations and politics
Management of documents and archives
Museum and Art Management
Applied Bulgaristics
Science and Technology Research
Business and Administration Informations Technologies and Communications
Strategic Communications and Informing
Faculty of Information Sciences:
Information Technologies
IT in the Media Industry (in co-operation with the Moscow State University of Printing Arts)
Technical Entrepreneurship and Information Technologies Innovation
Electronic Business and Elevtronic Management
Software Engineering
Information Technologies and Finance Engineering
National security: State, Spirituality and Leadership
National Security
Information Security

See also
 List of universities in Bulgaria

References

External links
 State University of Library Studies and Information Technologies
 Moscow State University of Printing Arts

Universities in Sofia
Technical universities and colleges in Bulgaria
Educational institutions established in 1950
1950 establishments in Bulgaria